A supreme leader or supreme ruler typically refers to the person among a number of leaders of a state, organization or other such group who has been given or is able to exercise the mostor completeauthority over it. In a religion, this role is usually satisfied by a person deemed to be the representative or manifestation of a deity or God on Earth. In politics, a supreme leader usually rules over an authoritarian or  totalitarian government and have a cult of personality associated with them. Historic examples are Adolf Hitler of Nazi Germany, Benito Mussolini of Fascist Italy, and Joseph Stalin of the Soviet Union.

List of titles

Listed by date of establishment.

1920s/30s and earlier
 Alexander Kolchak, White leader in the Russian Civil War as "Supreme Ruler of Russia".
 Benito Mussolini, dictator of Italy from 1922 to 1943 and of Italian Social Republic from 1943 to 1945, was known as Duce ("leader").
 Antanas Smetona, the authoritarian president of Lithuania (1926-1940), adopted the title of Tautos Vadas ("Leader of the Nation").
 Emperor Hirohito, emperor of Imperial Japan under the Meiji Constitution from 1926 to 1947, sometimes known as Mikado  ("August Gate").
 Chiang Kai-shek, de facto leader of the Kuomintang Republic of China on the mainland (1928-1949) and in Taiwan (1949-1975), was sometimes referred as lingxiu
 Joseph Stalin, the first General Secretary of the Communist Party of the Soviet Union and dictator of the Soviet Union, decreed that he was to be officially designated as Vozhd from his fiftieth birthday in 1929.
 Getúlio Vargas, dictator of Brazil from 1930 to 1945, was known as the "Supreme Leader of Revolution".
 Rafael Trujillo, Dominican dictator from 1930 to 1961, assumed the nickname of "El Jefe" ("The Boss").
 Adolf Hitler, dictator of Nazi Germany from 1933 to 1945, was known as Führer ("The Leader").
 Engelbert Dollfuss and Kurt Schuschnigg, austrofascist leaders of Austria from 1933 to 1938, were referred to as Bundesführer ("Federal Leader") as heads of the Fatherland Front.
 Karlis Ulmanis, the authoritarian president of Latvia from 1934 to 1940, adopted the title of Tautas Vadonis ("Leader of People") and Nācijas Tēvs ("Father of the Nation").
 Francisco Franco, dictator of Francoist Spain, assumed the title Caudillo, originally an honorary title for an army leader.
 Birger Furugård, leader of the Swedish National Socialist Party had the title of Riksledaren ("Leader of the Realm").
 Ioannis Metaxas, Greek dictator during the 4th of August Regime from 1936 until his death in 1941, assumed the title of Αρχηγός (Archigós) meaning "The Leader".

World War II
 Ante Pavelić, as dictator of the Independent State of Croatia, named himself Poglavnik ("The Leader").
 Ferenc Szálasi, as dictator of the Hungarian State, named himself Nemzetvezető ("Leader of the Nation").
 Josef Tiso, President of the First Slovak Republic, named himself Vodca ("The Leader") in 1942.
 Ion Antonescu, as Prime Minister of Romania during most of World War II, named himself Conducător ("The Leader").
 Vidkun Quisling, leader of Nasjonal Samling and from 1942 Minister-President of the nominal Quisling regime, named himself Fører ("Leader").
 Frits Clausen, leader of the National Socialist Workers' Party of Denmark, had the title of Fører ("Leader").
 Anton Mussert, leader of the National Socialist Movement in the Netherlands, was allowed to use the title Leider van het Nederlandsche Volk ("Leader of the Dutch people") by the Germans in 1942.
 Léon Degrelle, leader of the Rexist Party, was named Chef-du-People-Wallon ("Leader of the Walloon people") in December 1944.
 Jef van de Wiele, leader of the DeVlag party, was named Landsleider van het Vlaamsche Volk ("National Leader of the Flemish people") in December 1944.
 Staf de Clercq, co-founder and leader of the Flemish nationalist Vlaamsch Nationaal Verbond, was referred to as den Leider by his followers.
 Oswald Mosley, leader of the British Union of Fascists, was known as "The Leader".
 Josip Broz Tito, leader of the League of Communists of Yugoslavia, was known as "Marshal".

Cold War era
 Mao Zedong, the first Chairman of the Chinese Communist Party and Chairman of the Central Military Commission, officially named "Great Leader Chairman"
 Deng Xiaoping, the de facto leader of the People's Republic of China and Chairman of the Central Military Commission of the Chinese Communist Party, officially named  "The chief architect of China's reform opening and modernization drive".
 Kim Il-Sung, the General Secretary of the Workers' Party of Korea and the first leader of North Korea, is officially referred to by the North Korean government as "Great Leader".
 Ho Chi Minh, the only one Chairman of the Communist Party of Vietnam is referred to many times as Lãnh Tụ (The leader of all), which has the Sino-Vietnamese root of the word "Lǐngxiù" (领袖) in Chinese, although the word "Lãnh Tụ" is also sometimes used to address a beloved or supreme leader of any other country.
 Liaquat Ali Khan, the first Prime Minister of independent Pakistan was named as Quaid-i-Millat ("Leader of the Nation") and Shaheed-i-Millat ("Martyr of the Nation").
 Sukarno, the president of post-revolution Indonesia was known as the Pemimpin Besar Revolusi (Great Leader of the Revolution) and Bung Karno ("Comrade Karno").
 François Duvalier, the president-dictator of Haiti, obtained from the pocket parliament "Supreme Leader of Revolution" amongst other titles.
 Ferdinand Marcos, the president-dictator of the Philippines, sometimes named as Pinuno ng Bansa "Leader of the Nation".
 Fidel Castro, the First Secretary of the Communist Party of Cuba was known as the Máximo Líder ("Greatest Leader").
 Enver Hoxha, the First Secretary of the Party of Labour of Albania was named as "The Leader", "Supreme Comrade", "Sole Force", "Great Teacher".
 Nicolae Ceaușescu, the General Secretary of the Romanian Communist Party from 1965 to 1989, was sometimes referred to as Conducător.
 Mobutu Sese Seko, the president-dictator of Zaire, sometimes named as "Father of People" and "Saver of Nation".
 Alfredo Stroessner, the dictatorial president of Paraguay from 1954 to 1989, was eulogized as Gran Líder and Único Líder.
 Abd al-Karim Qasim, Prime Minister of Iraq from 1958 to 1963, named as al-za'īm ("The Leader").
 Saddam Hussein, the president-dictator of Iraq from 1979 to 2003, named as "The Leader".
 Muammar Gaddafi, the Brotherly Leader and Guide of the Revolution of Libya from 1979 to 2011.
 Omar Torrijos, de facto dictator of Panama from 1968 to 1981, assumed the title Líder Máximo de la Revolución Panameña ("Supreme Leader of the Panamanian Revolution").
 Dési Bouterse, de facto leader of Suriname during 1980 military rule
 The Supreme Leader of Iran, the highest-ranking political and religious authority in the constitution of the Islamic Republic of Iran. The first person to hold this title was the Ayatollah Khomeini.
 Pol Pot, the General Secretary of the Communist Party of Kampuchea and former dictator of Kampuchea.

Post–Cold War era
 Supreme Leader of Afghanistan, first held by Mullah Omar from 1996 to 2001; also used in exile during the Taliban insurgency
 Hibatullah Akhundzada, current supreme leader of Afghanistan since 2021
 Hugo Chávez, former President of Venezuela, was called El Comandante (The Commander) by some people during his reign.
Xi Jinping, current General Secretary of the Chinese Communist Party, has been officially recognized as lingxiu, a reverential term for "leader", by the Party Politburo.
 Kim Jong-il, former General Secretary of the Workers' Party of Korea, is officially referred to by the North Korean government as 위대한 령도자 (translit. widaehan ryŏngdoja - "Honorable Leader") and "The Leader" (his father Kim Il-Sung after death stayed as "Great Leader").
 Kim Jong Un, current General Secretary of the Workers' Party of Korea, was made "Supreme Guide" after his father Kim Jong-Il died in 2011.
 Ali Khamenei, current Supreme Leader of Iran since 4 June 1989.
 Nursultan Nazarbayev, Chairman of the Security Council of Kazakhstan from 1991 to 2022, and first President of Kazakhstan, was granted the title Elbasy by a parliamentary decision in 2010.
 Saparmurat Niyazov, president of Turkmenistan in 1990–2006, was referred by his self-given titles Sardar ("Leader") and Türkmenbaşy ("Head of the Turkmens"). His successor Gurbanguly Berdimuhamedow carries the title Arkadag ("Protector", "Patron").
Emomali Rahmon, President of the Republic of Tajikistan since 1994, carries the title Peşvoi Millat.
 Nawaz Sharif, ex-prime minister of Pakistan, was made the Supreme Leader of his political party PML-N after the Pakistan Supreme Court ruled that as he was disqualified under the constitution for dishonesty, he can no longer serve as the head of a political party.

Popular media
In the 2012 movie The Dictator, the titular character was referred to as "Supreme Leader."

See also
 Absolute monarchy
 Autocracy
 Centralisation
 Despotism
 Dictatorship
 Führerprinzip
 Tyranny

References

Heads of state
Heads of government